Victim blaming occurs when the victim of a crime or any wrongful act is held entirely or partially at fault for the harm that befell them. There is historical and current prejudice against the victims of domestic violence and sex crimes, such as the greater tendency to blame victims of rape than victims of robbery if victims and perpetrators knew each other prior to the commission of the crime.

Coining of the phrase
Psychologist William Ryan coined the phrase "blaming the victim" in his 1971 book of that title. In the book, Ryan described victim blaming as an ideology used to justify racism and social injustice against black people in the United States. Ryan wrote the book to refute Daniel Patrick Moynihan's 1965 work The Negro Family: The Case for National Action (usually simply referred to as the Moynihan Report).

Moynihan had concluded that three centuries of oppression of black people, and in particular with what he calls the uniquely cruel structure of American slavery as opposed to its Latin American counterparts, had created a long series of chaotic disruptions within the black family structure which, at the time of the report, manifested itself in high rates of unwed births, absent fathers, and single mother households in black families. Moynihan then correlated these familial outcomes, which he considered undesirable, to the relatively poorer rates of employment, educational achievement, and financial success found among the black population. The black family structure is also being affected by media through the children. The Black family is usually portrayed as gang affiliated, a single-parent or very violent. Aggression and violent behavior in children has been linked to television programming.  Moynihan advocated the implementation of government programs designed to strengthen the black nuclear family.

Ryan objected that Moynihan then located the proximate cause of the plight of black Americans in the prevalence of a family structure in which the father was often sporadically, if at all, present, and the mother was often dependent on government aid to feed, clothe, and provide medical care for her children. Ryan's critique cast the Moynihan theories as attempts to divert responsibility for poverty from social structural factors to the behaviors and cultural patterns of the poor.

History
Although Ryan popularized the phrase, other scholars had identified the phenomenon of victim blaming.
In 1947 Theodor W. Adorno defined what would be later called "blaming the victim," as "one of the most sinister features of the Fascist character".

Shortly thereafter Adorno and three other professors at the University of California, Berkeley formulated their influential and highly debated F-scale (F for fascist), published in The Authoritarian Personality (1950), which included among the fascist traits of the scale the "contempt for everything discriminated against or weak." A typical expression of victim blaming is the "asking for it" idiom, e.g. "she was asking for it" said of a victim of violence or sexual assault.

Secondary victimization of sexual and other assault victims

Secondary victimization is the re-traumatization of the (including but not limited to: sexual assault, abuse, surgical battery, medical malpractice, or rape) victim through the responses of individuals and institutions. Types of secondary victimization include victim blaming, disbelieving the victim's story, minimizing the severity of the attack, and inappropriate post-assault treatment by medical personnel or other organizations. Secondary victimization is especially common in cases of drug-facilitated, acquaintance, military sexual trauma and statutory rape.

Sexual assault victims experience stigmatization based on rape myths. A female rape victim is especially stigmatized in patrilineal cultures with strong customs and taboos regarding sex and sexuality. For example, a society may view a female rape victim (especially one who was previously a virgin) as "damaged". Victims in these cultures may suffer isolation, physical and psychological abuse, slut-shaming, public humiliation rituals, be disowned by friends and family, be prohibited from marrying, be divorced if already married, or even be killed. However, even in many developed countries, including some sectors of United States society, misogyny remains culturally ingrained.

One example of a sexist allegation against female victims of sexual assault is that wearing provocative clothing stimulates sexual aggression in men who believe that women wearing body-revealing clothes are actively trying to seduce a sexual partner. Such accusations against victims stem from the assumption that sexually revealing clothing conveys consent for sexual actions, irrespective of willful verbal consent.  Research has yet to prove that attire is a significant causal factor in determining who is assaulted.

Victim blaming is also exemplified when a victim of sexual assault is found at fault for performing actions which reduce their ability to resist or refuse consent, such as consuming alcohol. Victim advocacy groups and medical professionals are educating young adults on the definition of consent, and the importance of refraining from victim blaming.  Most institutions have adopted the concept of affirmative consent and that refraining from sexual activity while under the influence is the safest choice.

In efforts to discredit alleged sexual assault victims in court, a defense attorney may delve into an accuser's personal history, a common practice that also has the purposeful effect of making the victim so uncomfortable they choose not to proceed. This attack on character, especially one pointing out promiscuity, makes the argument that women who lead "high risk" lifestyles (promiscuity, drug use) are not real victims of rape.

Findings on Rape Myth Acceptance have supported feminist claims that sexism is at the root of female rape victim blaming.

A 2009 study in the Journal of Interpersonal Violence of male victims of sexual assault concludes that male rape victim blaming is usually done so because of social constructs of masculinity. Some effects of these kind of rape cases include a loss of masculinity, confusion about their sexual orientation, and a sense of failure in behaving as men should.

Victims of an unwanted sexual encounter usually develop psychological problems such as depression or sexual violence specific PTSD known as rape trauma syndrome.

Ideal victim
An ideal victim is one who is afforded the status of victimhood due to unavoidable circumstances that put the individual at a disadvantage. One can apply this theory to any crime including and especially sexual assault. Nils Christie, a Norwegian criminology professor, has been theorizing about the concept of the ideal victim since the 1980s. In his research he gives two examples, one of an old woman who is attacked on her way home from visiting her family and the other of a man who is attacked at a bar by someone he knew. He describes the old woman as an ideal victim because she could not avoid being in the location that she was, she did not know her attacker, and she could not fight off her attacker. The man, however, could have avoided being at a bar, knew his attacker, and should have been able to fight off his attacker, being younger and a man.

When applying the ideal victim theory to sexual assault victims, often judicial proceedings define an ideal victim as one who resists their attacker and exercises caution in risky situations, despite law reforms to extinguish these fallacious requirements. When victims are not ideal they are at risk for being blamed for their attack because they are not considered real victims of rape.

A victim who is not considered an ideal, or real victim, is one who leads a "high risk" lifestyle, partaking in drugs or alcohol, or is perceived as promiscuous. A victim who intimately knows their attacker is also not considered an ideal victim. An example of a sexual assault victim who is not ideal is a prostitute because they lead a high risk lifestyle. The perception is that these behaviors discount the credibility of a sexual assault victim's claim or that the behaviors and associations create the mistaken assumption of consent. Some of or all of the blame of the assault is then placed on these victims, and so they are not worthy of having their case presented in court. These perceptions persist in court rulings despite a shift in laws favoring affirmative consent- meaning that the participants in a sexual activity give a verbal affirmation rather than one participant who neither answers negatively nor positively. In other words, affirmative consent is yes means yes, no means no and no verbal answer also means no.

In addition to an ideal victim, there must be an ideal perpetrator for a crime to be considered ideal. The ideal attacker does not know their victim and is a completely non-sympathetic figure- one who is considered sub-human, an individual lacking morals. An attacker that knows their victim is not considered an ideal attacker, nor is someone who seems morally ordinary. Cases of intimate partner violence are not considered ideal because the victim knows their attacker. Husbands and wives are not ideal victims or perpetrators because they are intimately familiar with each other.

The problems with simplistically treating victims and offenders as ideal is highlighted in crimes involving battered woman syndrome.

Global situation
Many different cultures across the globe have formulated different degrees of victim blaming for different scenarios such as rape, hate crimes, and domestic abuse. Victim blaming is common around the world, especially in cultures where it is socially acceptable and advised to treat certain groups of people as lesser. For example, in Somalia victims of sexual abuse consistently endure social ostracization and harassment. One specific example is the kidnapping and rape of 14-year old Fatima: when the police arrived, both Fatima and her rapist were arrested. While they did not detain the offender for long, the officers held Fatima captive for a month and a prison guard continually raped her during that time.

In February 2016, the organisations International Alert and UNICEF published a study revealing that girls and women released from captivity by Nigeria's insurgency group Boko Haram often face rejection by their communities and families. Their children born of sexual violence faced even more discrimination.

Acid attacks on South Asian women, when people throw acid on women in an attempt to punish them for their perceived wrongdoings, are another example of victim-blaming. For instance, in New Delhi in 2005, a group of men threw acid on a 16-year-old girl because they believed she provoked the advances of a man. In Chinese culture, victim blaming is often associated with the crime of rape, as women are expected to resist rape using physical force. Thus, if rape occurs, it is considered to be at least partly the woman's fault and her virtue is inevitably called into question.

In Western culture victim blaming has been largely recognized as a problematic way to view a situation, however this does not exempt Westerners from being guilty of the action. A recent example of Western victim blaming would be a civil trial held in 2013 where the Los Angeles School District blamed a 14-year-old girl for the sexual abuse she endured from her middle school teacher. The District's lawyer argued that the minor was responsible for the prevention of the abuse, putting the entire fault on the victim and exempting the perpetrator of any responsibility. Despite his efforts to convince the court that the victim must be blamed, the ruling stated that no minor student that has been sexually assaulted by his or her teacher is responsible for the prevention of that sexual assault.

Opposing views
Roy Baumeister, a social and personality psychologist, argued that blaming the victim is not necessarily always fallacious. He argued that showing the victim's possible role in an altercation may be contrary to typical explanations of violence and cruelty, which incorporate the trope of the innocent victim. According to Baumeister, in the classic telling of "the myth of pure evil," the innocent, well-meaning victims are going about their business when they are suddenly assaulted by wicked, malicious evildoers. Baumeister describes the situation as a possible distortion by both the perpetrator and the victim; the perpetrator may minimize the offense while the victim maximizes it, and so accounts of the incident shouldn't be immediately taken as objective truths.

In context, Baumeister refers to the common behavior of the aggressor seeing themselves as more of the "victim" than the abused, justifying a horrific act by way of their "moral complexity". This usually stems from an "excessive sensitivity" to insults, which he finds as a consistent pattern in abusive husbands. Essentially, the abuse the perpetrator administers is generally excessive, in comparison to the act/acts that they claim as to have provoked them.

Scientific studies on victim blaming
A scientific review by Sharron J. Lennon, a specialist in consumer behavior and the social-psychology of dress, found that women who wear immodest or sexual clothing self-objectify themselves, which causes anxiety, unhappiness, body-dissatisfaction, and body shame. She found that "wearing sexy dress [was linked to] violence including sexual coercion, sexual harassment, sexual assault, and unwelcome groping, touching, and grabbing." Out of the 34 studies she reviewed, only two did not find a link between wearing sexual clothing and a higher rate of sexual harassment. However, higher rates of sexual harassment were linked to higher rates of sexual behavior which resulted in higher rates of sexual violence. Thus for women, wearing modest clothing but behaving in a sexual manner, such as flirting, twerking or flashing a bra, would result in higher rates of sexual violence.

Horseshoe theory and nonpolarized views
Some scholars make the argument that some of the attitudes that are described as victim blaming and the victimologies that are said to counteract them are both extreme and similar to each other, an example of the horseshoe theory. For instance, they argue that the claim that "women wearing provocative clothing cause rape" is as demeaning to men as it is to women as depicting men as incapable of controlling their sexual desire is misandrist and denies men full agency, while also arguing that the generalization that women do not lie about rape (or any generalization about women not doing some things because of their gender) is misogynist by its implicit assumption that women act by simple default action modes which is incompatible with full agency. These scholars argue that it is important to impartially assess the evidence in each criminal trial individually and that any generalization based on statistics would change the situation from one where the control of evidence makes false reporting difficult to one where lack of individual control of the alleged crime makes it easier to file false reports and that statistics collected in the former situation would not be possible to apply to the latter situation. While the scholars make a distinction between actual victim blaming and rule by law that they consider to be falsely lumped with victim blaming in radical feminist rhetorics, they also advocate more protection from ad hominem questions to alleged victims about past life history and that the questions should focus on what is relevant for the specific alleged crime. They also cite examples that they consider to be cases of the horseshoe theory applied to the question of victim blaming. This includes cases in which psychologists who have testified on behalf of the prosecution in trials in which breast size have been used as a measure of female age when classifying pornographic cartoons as child pornography and been praised by feminists for it, and later the same psychologists have used the same psychological arguments when testifying on behalf of the defense in statutory rape cases and getting the defendant acquitted by claiming that the victim's breasts looked like those of an adult woman (considered by these scholars to be victim blaming based on appearance) and been praised by men's rights groups for it. It also includes the possibility that biopsychiatric models that consider sexual criminality hereditary and that are advocated by some feminists may blame victims of incest abuse for being genetically related to their abusers and thereby dissuading them from reporting abuse.

Other analysts of victim blaming discourse who neither support most of the phenomena that are described as victim blaming nor most of the measures that are marketed as countermeasures against such point at the existence of other ways of discovering and punishing crimes with victims besides the victim reporting the crime. Not only are there police patrols and possible eyewitnesses, but these analysts also argue that neighbors can overhear and report crimes that take place within the house such as domestic violence. For that reason along with the possibility of many witnesses turning up over time if the crime is ongoing long term as domestic abuse is generally said to be which would make some of the witnesses likely to be considered believable, analysts of this camp of thought argue that the main problem that prevent crimes from being successfully prosecuted is offender profiling that disbelieve the capacity and/or probability of many criminals to commit the crime, rather than disbelief or blaming of victim reports. These analysts cite international comparisons that show that the percentage of male on female cases in the statistics of successfully prosecuted domestic violence is not higher in countries that apply gender feminist theories about patriarchal structures than in countries that apply supposedly antifeminist evolutionary psychology profiling of sex differences in aggressiveness, impulse control and empathy, arguing that the criminal justice system prioritizing cases in which they believe the suspect most likely to be guilty makes evolutionary psychology at least as responsible as gender feminism for leaving domestic violence cases with female offenders undiscovered no matter if the victim is male or female. The analysts argue that many problems that are often attributed to victim blaming are instead due to offender profiling, and suggest randomized investigations instead of psychological profiling of suspected offenders.

Examples
A myth holds that Jews went passively "like sheep to the slaughter" during The Holocaust, which is considered by many writers, including Emil Fackenheim, to be a form of victim blaming. Secondary antisemitism is a type of antisemitism caused by non-Jewish Europeans' attempts to shift blame for the Holocaust onto the Jews, often summed up by the claim that "The Germans will never forgive the Jews for Auschwitz."

In recent years, the issue of victim blaming has gained notoriety and become widely recognized in the media, particularly in the context of feminism, as women have often been blamed for behaving in ways that encourage harassment.

Australia
Leigh Leigh, born Leigh Rennea Mears, was a 14-year-old girl from Fern Bay, New South Wales, Australia, who was murdered on 3 November 1989. While attending a 16-year-old boy's birthday party at Stockton Beach, Leigh was assaulted by a group of boys after she returned distressed from a sexual encounter on the beach that a reviewing judge later called non-consensual. After being kicked and spat on by the group, Leigh left the party. Her naked body was found in the sand dunes nearby the following morning, with severe genital damage and a crushed skull. Leigh's murder received considerable attention in the media. Initially focusing on her sexual assault and murder, media attention later concentrated more on the lack of parental supervision and the drugs and alcohol at the party, and on Leigh's sexuality. The media coverage of the murder has been cited as an example of victim blaming.

Former Australian Senator Fraser Anning was sharply criticised for his comments about the Christchurch mosque shootings in New Zealand, in which 51 Muslim worshippers were killed. He claimed that immigration of "Muslim fanatics" led to the attacks, and that "while Muslims may have been victims today, usually they are the perpetrators". Anning also stated that the massacre "highlights...the growing fear within our community...of the increasing Muslim presence". The comments received international attention and were overwhelmingly criticised as being insensitive and racist, and sympathetic to the views of the perpetrator.

In some Common Law jurisdictions such as the UK, Canada, and several Australian states, the defense of provocation is only available against a charge of murder and only acts to reduce the conviction to manslaughter. Until recently criminal courts have regarded sexual infidelity such as adultery and fornication as sufficiently grave provocation as to provide a warrant, indeed a 'moral warrant', for reducing murder to manslaughter. While the warrant has spilled over into diminished responsibility defences, wounding, grievous bodily harm and attempted murder cases, it is provocation cases that have provided the precedents enshrining a defendant's impassioned homicidal sexual infidelity tale as excusatory. Periodically, judges and law reformers attempt to rein in provocation defences, most recently in England and Wales where provocation has been replaced by a loss of control defence that, most controversially, specifically excludes sexual infidelity as a trigger for loss of control.

Germany
In 2016, in the wake of New Year's Eve sexual assaults in Germany, the mayor of Cologne Henriette Reker came under heavy criticism, as her response appeared to blame the victims. She called for women to follow a "code of conduct," including staying at an "arm's length" from strangers. By the evening of 5 January, #einearmlänge ("an arm's length") became one of Germany's top-trending hashtags on Twitter. Reker called a crisis meeting with the police in response to the incidents. Reker called it "completely improper" to link the perpetrators to refugees.

Italy
Coverage of the 2016 Murder of Ashley Ann Olsen, an American murdered in Italy during a sexual encounter with a Senegalese immigrant, focused on the victim blaming in cross-cultural encounters.

India
In a case that attracted worldwide coverage, when a woman was raped and killed in Delhi in December 2012, some Indian government officials and political leaders blamed the victim for various things, mostly based on conjecture. Many of the people involved later apologized.

In August 2017, the hashtag #AintNoCinderella trended on social media India, in response to a high-profile instance of victim-blaming. After Varnika Kundu was stalked and harassed by two men on her way home late at night, Bharatiya Janata Party Vice President Ramveer Bhatti addressed the incident with a claim that Kundu was somehow at fault for being out late by herself. Social media users took to Twitter and Instagram to challenge the claim that women should not be out late at night, and if they are, they are somehow "asking for it". Hundreds of women shared photos of themselves staying out past midnight, dressing boldly, and behaving in (harmless) ways that tend to be condemned in old-fashioned, anti-feminist ideology.

United States
In 1938 the Madera Tribune ran the front page headline "Mother Blames her Daughter Equally with Man for Murder" in describing the stabbing death of 19-year-old Leona Vlught in Oakland. The victim's mother's "resentment against the boy who killed her" was said to be softened upon learning that her daughter drank alcohol and "went on a petting party when she was supposed to be spending the night with girl friends". The perpetrator Rodney Greig was later convicted of the crime and executed in the San Quentin gas chamber.

In a 2010 case, an 11-year-old female rape victim who suffered repeated gang rapes in Cleveland, Texas, was accused by a defense attorney of being a seductress who lured men to their doom.  "Like the spider and the fly. Wasn't she saying, 'Come into my parlor', said the spider to the fly?", he asked a witness. The New York Times ran an article uncritically reporting on the way many in the community blamed the victim, for which the newspaper later apologized.

See also

Notes

References

Further reading

External links
 Information on victim blaming at the Sexual Assault Centre of Edmonton (SACE)
 Information on victim blaming at the Canadian Resource Centre for Victims of Crime
 Victim Blame and Sexual Assault

Authoritarianism
Anti-social behaviour
Bullying
Borderline personality disorder
Causal fallacies
Diversionary tactics
Human behavior
Moral psychology
Narcissism 
Prejudices
Psychological abuse
Rape
Relevance fallacies
Sexual abuse
Victimology